The raising of the son of the widow of Nain (or Naim) is an account of a miracle by Jesus, recorded in the Gospel of Luke chapter 7. Jesus arrived at the village of Nain during the burial ceremony of the son of a widow, and raised the young man from the dead.

The location is the village of Nain, two miles south of Mount Tabor. This is the first of three miracles of Jesus in the canonical gospels in which he raises the dead, the other two being the raising of Jairus' daughter and of Lazarus.

Biblical account
The miracle is described thus in Luke 7:

Interpretation

The raising of the son of the widow of Zarephath, by the Old Testament prophet Elijah (1 Kings 17), is seen by Fred Craddock as the model for this miracle, as there are several parallels in the details, especially some verbal parallels. The raising of the son of the woman of Shunem (2 Kings 4) by Elisha is also similar, including the reaction of the people. In particular, the location of Nain is very close to Shunem, identified with modern Sulam. Sinclair Ferguson calls attention to this as an example of a repeated pattern in the history of redemption. He concludes that the pattern repetition 
"comes to its fullness in the person of Jesus Christ, the great prophet who heals not merely through delegated authority from God, but on his own authority, without rituals or prayers, but with a simple word of power. Here is the great God and Saviour of Israel in the flesh"...

The woman in the story had lost both her husband and her only son, so that there was no one left to support her. As she could not have inherited the land, the loss of her only son would have left her dependent on the charity of more distant relatives and neighbours.

Both this account and the preceding one of the healing of the Centurion's servant serve as a precursor to Jesus' assurance to the imprisoned John the Baptist that He is truly, 'the one who is to come', since, 'the dead are raised.'.

See also
 Ministry of Jesus
 Miracles of Jesus
 New Testament places associated with Jesus
 Parables of Jesus
 Church of the Resurrection of the Widow's Son

Further reading

References

Miracles of Jesus
Resurrection
Gospel of Luke
Women in the New Testament
Widowhood